Weightlifting at the Friendship Games was contested at the Palace of Culture and Sports in Varna, Bulgaria between 12 and 16 September 1984. 80 athletes competed in 10 events (all men's individual).

World records were broken thirty times during the competition.

Medal summary

Details
List of top three results in every category.

Flyweight

Bantamweight

Featherweight

Lightweight

Middleweight

Light-heavyweight

Middle-heavyweight

First-heavyweight

Heavyweight

Super heavyweight

World records broken
World records were broken thirty times. Some were beaten "off competition" after the competition ended. Often, records were broken multiple times in one category. In such case, only the final record is listed here.

Medal table

See also
 Weightlifting at the 1984 Summer Olympics

Notes

References

External links

Friendship Games
1984 in weightlifting
1984 in Bulgarian sport
Friendship Games
International weightlifting competitions hosted by Bulgaria
Sport in Varna, Bulgaria